Moerbeek is a hamlet in the Dutch province of North Holland. It is a part of the municipality of Hollands Kroon, and lies about 11 km north of Heerhugowaard.

Moerbeek is not a statistical entity, and the postal authorities have placed it under Lutjewinkel. Moerbeek has place name signs. It was home to 90 people in 1840. Nowadays, it consists of about 60 houses.

References

Populated places in North Holland
Hollands Kroon